This is a list of public art by Claes Oldenburg and Coosje van Bruggen, also termed their "large scale projects". Oldenburg (1929-2022) and van Bruggen (1942–2009) were married Swedish-American and American-Dutch sculptors (respectively), best known for their Installation art typically featuring very large replicas of everyday objects. This list does not include all other types of artistic works by the artists (for example drawings and "happenings") and other sculptural works which are not public art (for example soft sculptures such as "Giant BLT").

With the exception of the earliest works, Lipstick, Three-Way Plug and Clothespin, all works listed are signed by both artists. Unless specified, dimensions are listed as height × width × depth.

Images may be missing from this list, due to no freedom of panorama provisions for copyrighted three-dimensional artworks in the copyright laws of countries where the affected artworks are located.

Public art
Public art
Oldenburg and van Bruggen

es:Claes Oldenburg#Claes Oldenburg y su etapa junto a Coosje van Bruggen